Diplognathus is a genus of arthrodire placoderm from the Late Famennian Cleveland Shale of Late Devonian Ohio, known only from incomplete fragments of jaws and skulls.  What fragments are known suggest that the living animals were large-eyed piscivores with weak, but widely gaping jaws.  D. mirabilis is thought to be fairly large, with infragnathals up to 45 centimeters in length.  The second species, D. larfargei, was much smaller, with inferognathals averaging about 4 centimeters in length.

In 1967, Obruchev placed this genus within Hadrosteidae, on the basis of how the two genera have similar denticle ("teeth") patterns of the inferognathals, though Denison (1978) contested this placement, preferring to leave the taxon as Arthrodira incertae sedis.

References

Arthrodira enigmatic taxa
Placoderms of North America
Fossil taxa described in 1878
Paleontology in Ohio
Famennian life
Famennian genus first appearances
Famennian genus extinctions